is a 2006 album by Japanese rock band GO!GO!7188.

Track listing

References

GO!GO!7188 albums
2006 albums